Frankenstein's Wedding (also known as Frankenstein's Wedding… Live in Leeds) is a live musical drama based on Mary Shelley's 1818 novel Frankenstein; or, The Modern Prometheus. The show was broadcast live on BBC Three on 19 March 2011 from Kirkstall Abbey.

Summary
The show followed the same story line as Shelley's novel, however it was based mostly around the night of Victor Frankenstein's wedding. An audience of 12,000 watch from Kirkstall Abbey as Victor and Elizabeth Lavenza get married. Throughout the event scenes which had been filmed prior were shown, mainly focusing on Frankenstein's monster. There were moments in which the cast sang well known songs, including Andrew Gower performing the song "Wires"  by Athlete.

Cast
Lacey Turner as Elizabeth 'Liz' Lavenza 
Andrew Gower as Victor Frankenstein
David Harewood as The Creature
Mark Williams as Alphonse Frankenstein
Jemima Rooper as Justine Mortiz
Andrew Knott as Henry
Pearce Quigley as Uncle Alfred "Fred" Frankenstein
Gary Carr as Giles
Michael Higgs as a Detective
Anthony Lewis as a Policeman

Reception
The drama was nominated for the sport and live event award at the 2012 British Academy Television Awards.

References

External links

BBC television dramas
Works based on Frankenstein
2011 television specials